American rock band Real Friends has released three studio albums, seven extended plays and nine singles.

Studio albums

Compilation albums

Extended plays

Singles

Music videos

Other appearances

References
Footnotes

Citations

Discographies of American artists
Pop punk group discographies